Azirinomycin is an antibiotic azirine derivative with the molecular formula C4H5NO2 which is produced by the bacterium Streptomyces aureus. Azirinomycin was first isolated in 1971. Azirinomycin is toxic and  therefore it cannot not be used in human medicine.

References

Further reading 

 
 
 
 

Antibiotics
Heterocyclic compounds with 1 ring
Nitrogen heterocycles
Carboxylic acids